Gvedysh is a rural locality (a selo) and the administrative center of Gvedyshsky Selsoviet, Tlyaratinsky District, Republic of Dagestan, Russia. The population was 768 as of 2010.

Geography 
Gvedysh is located 8 km northeast of Tlyarata (the district's administrative centre) by road. Gendukh is the nearest rural locality.

References 

Rural localities in Tlyaratinsky District